Akhgar missile is an Iranian drone-launched air-to-ground missile operated by the Islamic Republic of Iran Air Force. This Unmanned aerial vehicle weapon, which is among the newest missiles of Iranian drones, has a range of 30 km, its weight is twenty seven kg and its maximum speed is 600 kilometers per hour.

Akhgar warhead weighs 27 kilograms, its length is 1.7 m and it has a diameter of 13 cm. The unmanned aerial vehicle missile is of the television-guidance type and its engine is made from the type of "micro-jet engine". This missile can be installed on the Kaman-12 (UAV), which is capable of carrying/firing from a distance of 30 kilometers by the UAV to various targets. The unveiling of this UAV-missile took place on 30 January 2019 in the "Iqtedar 40" exhibition, corresponding to the defense achievements of the Iranian Armed Forces.

See also 
 List of military equipment manufactured in Iran
 Armed Forces of the Islamic Republic of Iran
 Defense industry of Iran
 Kaman-12 (UAV)

References

Islamic Republic of Iran Army
Guided missiles of Iran